Liuji is a town of Dawu County in northeastern Hubei province, China, located  southeast of the county seat.

Administrative Divisions 
The following list is an approximate rendering of the names of the village-level divisions of Liuji into a romanized form derived from Standard Mandarin pinyin:

One community:
Liuji

Fifteen villages:
Jinhe, Jingu, Dading, Kuaigang (or Huigang), Tiezhai, Heshan, Diangang, Liuji, Lanchong (including Shangtouhe), Magang, Shahe, Wangsi, Changchong, Jianshe, and Liupeng.

See also 
 List of township-level divisions of Hubei

References 

Township-level divisions of Hubei